Valakom may refer to

 Valakom, Kottarakara, a village in the Kollam district, Kerala, India
 Valakam, Ernakulam district, a village in the Muvattupuzha taluk of Ernakuam district, Kerala, India